Messages (formerly known as Android Messages) is an SMS, RCS, and instant messaging application developed by Google for its Android and WearOS mobile operating systems, while it's also available via the Web. Messages is Google's official universal messaging platform for the Android ecosystem, similar to the implementation of iMessage in Apple devices.

History
The original code for Android SMS messaging was released in 2009 integrated into the Operating System. It was released as a standalone application independent of Android with the release of Android 5.0 Lollipop in 2014, replacing Google Hangouts as the default SMS app on Google's Nexus line of phones.

In 2018, Messages adopted RCS messages and was evolved to send larger data files, sync with other apps, and even create mass messages. This was in preparation for when Google launched messages for web.

In December 2019, Google rolled out support for RCS messaging (under the name chat features) in the United States, United Kingdom, France and Mexico. This was followed by a wider global rollout throughout 2020.

The app surpassed 1 billion installs in April 2020, doubling its number of installs in less than a year.

Initially, the app did not support end-to-end encryption. In June 2021, Google introduced end-to-end encryption in Messages by default using the Signal Protocol, for all one-to-one RCS-based conversations, and for all group chats in December 2022 for beta users, with plans for full release in early 2023.

Beginning with the Samsung Galaxy S21, Messages replaces Samsung's in-house Messages app as the default messaging app for One UI in selected markets. In April 2021, the app began to receive a modification to its user interface in markets outside of the U.S. when running on recent Samsung phones, which adheres to its use of larger headers within in-house apps to improve ergonomics.

Features
Some of the most important features in Google Messages are:

 Send instant text and voice messages in 1:1 or group chat conversations over mobile data and Wi-Fi, via Android, WearOS or the Web.
 End-to-end encryption by default
 Typing, sent, delivered and read status
 Reply and react to specific messages
 Share files and high-resolution photos
 Voice message transcriptions
 Schedule messages
 In-app reminders for birthdays and messages you didn't respond to after some time with Nudges
 Tight integration with the Google ecosystem, e.g. Google Calendar, Meet, Maps, YouTube, Photos, Contacts, Assistant, Search, Safe Browsing etc.
 Web interface: The messages app can be used in a different device browser tab. To activate this feature, the user has to visit the webpage https://messages.google.com/web and scan the QR code that is shown in the web with the smartphone, by using that feature in the Messages app.
 Phone number recognition: The app shows country and province of the caller. Additionally, it can show the company´s name or a warning for spam calls if the number is registered in a data base.

See also
Messages (Apple)
iMessage
Google Allo
Google Chat

References

External links

Google instant messaging software
Instant messaging protocols

Instant messaging
Instant messaging clients
Google
Google services
Google software
Telecommunication services
Telecommunication protocols
Web applications
Communication software
Android (operating system) software